Hanlith is a small village and civil parish in the Craven district of North Yorkshire, England. It is situated near Kirkby Malham and the tourist attraction of Malham Cove. Its population was estimated at 40 in 2015.

Hanlith has a joint parish council, Kirkby Malhamdale Parish Council, with the parishes of Malham, Kirkby Malham and Malham Moor.

History 
Hanlith dates back as a manor to the Domesday Book of 1086 when it was spelt Hangelif.  The name is of Old Norse origin, from the personal name Hagne and hlíð, meaning "slope", so means "Hagne's slope".  The reference is to the steep hillside east of the River Aire.

Hanlith Hall belonged to the Dehelington and Medcalfe families until about 1347, and then became tenanted to the Serjeantson family who remained there for 550 years. The Hall was remodelled in the 20th century.

Hanlith was historically a township in the ancient parish of Kirkby Malham in the West Riding of Yorkshire.  It became a civil parish in 1866, and in 1974 was transferred to the new county of North Yorkshire.

References

External links

Village and area web site
Hanlith history pages

Villages in North Yorkshire
Civil parishes in North Yorkshire